Augie is a Local Government Area in Kebbi State, Nigeria. Its headquarters are in the town of Augie.

Major Towns in the area include Bagaye, Birnin Tudu, Bubuce, Illela. The area is primarily agricultural producing sugarcane, mango, banana etc. The major language groups are Hausa, Fulani and Zabarmanci, and the population is predominantly Muslim. 

It has an area of 1,185 km and a population of 117,287 at the 2006 census. 
The postal code of the area is 861.

References

Local Government Areas in Kebbi State